This is a list of equipment used by the Latvian Land Forces.

Personal equipment 

The equipment of the Latvian Land Forces troops includes:

 LatPat, Multi-LatPat and WoodLatPat (Latvian digital camouflage uniform). 
 Norwegian BEAR-II load bearing armor system
 Kevlar helmet 
 Night vision device

Infantry weapons

Military vehicles

Artillery

Anti-ship weapons

Air-defence equipment

References

Military of Latvia
Latvian Land Forces